Bowbridge is a village in Gloucestershire, England, on the outskirts of Stroud.

Bowbridge Lock on the Thames and Severn Canal is in the process of restoration.

Field House on Bowbridge Lane is a 17th-century house, now converted into apartments: it was formerly a youth hostel, a Territorial Army base and the headquarters of the county Air Training Corps.

References

External links

Villages in Gloucestershire
Stroud District